Scott Township is a township in Montgomery County, Iowa, USA.

History
Scott Township was established in 1870. It was first called Stanton Township, but the name was soon changed.

References

Townships in Montgomery County, Iowa
Townships in Iowa